In pathology, a Councilman body, also known as a Councilman hyaline body or apoptotic body, is an eosinophilic globule of apoptotic hepatocyte cell fragments. Ultimately, the fragments are taken up by macrophages or adjacent parenchymal cells. They are found in the liver of individuals suffering from acute viral hepatitis, yellow fever, and other viral syndromes.

Associated conditions
Councilman bodies were first identified in Yellow fever, which characteristically shows a midzonal hepatic necrosis on biopsy. Similar inclusions are observed in other viral hemorrhagic fevers and all of the viral hepatitides. Liver biopsy of acute viral hepatitis shows panlobular lymphocytic infiltrates with ballooning hepatocytes.

Eponym
Councilman bodies are named after American pathologist William Thomas Councilman (1854–1933), who discovered them.

See also
 Ballooning degeneration
 Feathery degeneration
 Mallory body

References

Hepatology